John Wilson (17 November 1876 – 24 November 1957) was a Scottish rugby league administrator and road racing cyclist who competed in the 1912 Summer Olympics. Wilson was born in Muirden, Aberdeenshire.

In 1912 he was a member of the Scotland cycling team which finished fourth in the team time trial event. In the individual time trial competition he finished 16th.

Rugby League
For many years Wilson was an official of Hull Kingston Rovers and in 1920 was named as one of the two tour managers for the 1920 Great Britain Lions tour to Australia and New Zealand.  On his return from the tour he was appointed as the first paid secretary of the Rugby Football League then known as the Northern Union.  He remained secretary until retirement in 1946.

References

1876 births
1957 deaths
Scottish male cyclists
Olympic cyclists of Great Britain
Cyclists at the 1912 Summer Olympics
Scottish Olympic competitors
Road racing cyclists
Sportspeople from Aberdeenshire
Hull Kingston Rovers
British rugby league administrators